Fatih Al (born 12 September 1976) is a Turkish actor.

Biography 
Fatih Al was born 12 September 1976 in Ankara. He graduated from Ankara University's School of Language and History – Geography with a degree in theatre studies. Later, Al worked in city theatres and then acted in movies and television series. He made his television debut in 2003 with a role in the series Sihirli Annem. He subsequently appeared in the series Rüzgarlı Bahçe in 2005. In 2007, he was casr in the movie Hazan Mevsimi - Bir Panayır Hikâyesi as Cemal. In 2010, Al returned to stage with a role in the play Korkuyu Beklerken. In the following year he starred in the movie Bizim Büyük Çaresizliğimiz and went on stage again with the play Giderayak. In the same year, he began portraying Matrakçı Nasuh in the historical drama series Muhteşem Yüzyıl, after which he rose to prominence. In 2013, he starred in the movie Evdeki Yabancılar as Yaşar. In 2014, he appeared in the movie Daire as Feramus and starred in FOX's TV series Not Defteri as Mahir Soysal. He is also known for his role in the Netflix original series Atiye.

Filmography

Theatre 
 Giderayak, 2011 
 Korkuyu Beklerken, 2010
 Dolu Düşün Boş Konuş, 2014–2016

TV series 
 Sihirli Annem, 2005–2006, Hasan Ali 
 Rüzgarlı Bahçe, 2005, İbrahim
 Muhteşem Yüzyıl, 2011–2013, Matrakçı Nasuh
 Not Defteri, 2014, Mahir Soysal 
 Karadayı, 2014, Sosyete Yusuf
 Kanatsız Kuşlar, 2017, Muzaffer
 Atiye, 2019–2020, Nazım Kurtiz
 Kahraman Babam, 2021, Yavuz
 Menajerimi Ara, 2021, Timur
 Aşk 101, 2021, Yıldıray Pınar
 Adı Sevgi, 2022, Ekrem Baykara

Film 
 Hazan Mevsimi - Bir Panayır Hikâyesi, 2007, Cemal (İşçi)
 Bizim Büyük Çaresizliğimiz, 2011, Çetin 
 Evdeki Yabancılar, 2013, Yaşar 
 Daire, 2014, Feramus
 Uzaklarda Arama, 2015, Bakkal Ömer
 Beceriksiz Katil, 2017
 Sonsuz Aşk, 2017, Tufan
 Sofra Sırları
 Smuggling Hendrix, 2018, Hasan

References

External links 
 
 

Living people
1976 births
Turkish male film actors
Turkish male television actors
Male actors from Ankara
Turkish male stage actors